Theodore St John (1906–1956) was an American writer, actor and director of films, radio and theatre. In 1953 he won a Best Motion Picture Story Oscar for 1952's The Greatest Show on Earth.

He served in the army from 1942 to 1946. He died in 1956 of self-inflicted stab wounds.

Select credits
Ghosts (1927) - actor in Broadway production
The Greatest Show on Earth (1952) - screenplay
Fort Algiers (1953) - screenplay

References

External links

Theodore St John at IBDb

1906 births
1956 deaths
20th-century American screenwriters
1956 suicides
United States Army personnel of World War II
Suicides by sharp instrument in the United States